George Delaney is a professional rugby league footballer who plays as a  for Swinton Lions in the RFL Championship, on loan from St Helens (Heritage № 1276) in the Betfred Super League.

Delaney made his first team début for Saints in April 2022 against the Castleford Tigers.

References

External links
St Helens profile
Saints Heritage Society profile

2004 births
Living people
English rugby league players
Rugby league players from St Helens, Merseyside
Rugby league props
St Helens R.F.C. players
Swinton Lions players